Jezek Glacier is a glacier on the southeast side of Platform Spur, flowing northeast into Emmanuel Glacier in the Royal Society Range of Victoria Land, Antarctica. It was named by the Advisory Committee on Antarctic Names in 1992 after Kenneth C. Jezek, a geophysicist with the Cold Regions Research and Engineering Laboratory and the National Oceanic and Atmospheric Administration, 1983–89; in 12 visits to the Arctic and Antarctic he conducted geophysical surveys using remote sensing techniques on measurement and properties of terrestrial ice and sea ice with work at Dome Charlie, the Ross Ice Shelf and the Weddell Sea. From 1989 he was Director of the Byrd Polar Research Center.

References

Glaciers of Victoria Land
Scott Coast